is a passenger railway station located in the city of Kaizuka, Osaka Prefecture, Japan, operated by the private railway operator Nankai Electric Railway. It has the station number "NK27".

Lines

Layout
The station consists of two opposed side platforms connected by a level crossing.The station is unattended.

Platforms

Adjacent stations

History
Nishikinohama Station opened on 1 October 1938.

Passenger statistics
In fiscal 2019, the station was used by an average of 4489 passengers daily.

Surrounding area
 Nishikinohama Beach

See also
 List of railway stations in Japan

References

External links

  

Railway stations in Japan opened in 1938
Railway stations in Osaka Prefecture
Kaizuka, Osaka